Kaarlo Santeri Anttila (12 February 1874 – 1 July 1962) was a Finnish farmer, merchant and politician, born in Kurikka. He served as a Member of the Parliament of Finland from 1930 to 1933, representing the National Coalition Party.

References

1874 births
1962 deaths
People from Kurikka
People from Vaasa Province (Grand Duchy of Finland)
National Coalition Party politicians
Members of the Parliament of Finland (1930–33)
Place of death missing